The Way of the World is an album by American jazz/blues singer Mose Allison, released in 2010 on ANTI-. It was his first studio album since 1997's Gimcracks and Gewgaws. He decided to record the album after producer Joe Henry approached him in 2008 and persuaded him to come out of retirement.

Critical reception
According to Metacritic, The Way of the World has a score of 78 out of 100, indicating that it has received "generally favorable reviews" from critics.

Track listing 
All compositions by Mose Allison except as indicated.
 "My Brain" – 2:59
 "I Know You Didn't Mean It" – 3:28
 "Everybody Thinks You're an Angel" (Amy Allison) – 2:58
 "Let It Come Down" – 2:31
 "Modest Proposal" – 2:29
 "Crush" – 2:55
 "Some Right, Some Wrong" (Roosevelt Sykes) – 2:487
 "The Way of the World" (Mose Allison, Joe Henry) – 2:50
 "Ask Me Nice" – 3:19
 "Once in a While" (Michael Edwards/Bud Green) – 3:32
 "I'm Alright" (Loudon Wainwright III) – 3:11
 "This New Situation" (Buddy Johnson) – 2:08

Personnel 
Mose Allison – piano, vocals
Amy Allison – vocals on 12
Jay Bellerose – drums, percussion
Greg Leisz – acoustic guitar, electric guitar, Weissenborn, and mandola
David Piltch – upright bass
Walter Smith III – tenor saxophone
Anthony Wilson – electric guitar

References 

Mose Allison albums
2010 albums
Anti- (record label) albums